Time in Syria is given by Arabia Standard Time (AST) (UTC+03:00).

On October 4th 2022, Syria abolished daylight saving time (DST). Prior to that date, Syria used EET (UTC+02:00) and observed DST, as EEST (UTC+03:00). Transition dates had in general been last Friday of March (sometimes first Friday of April) to last Friday of October, or before 2006 1 April to 1 October with variations. This was similar, but not same as the European Union, where transition dates are on Sundays.

IANA time zone database
The IANA time zone database contains one zone for Syria in the file zone.tab, named Asia/Damascus.

References